Patrick Edward Rice (born November 2, 1963 in Rapid City, South Dakota) is an American former professional baseball pitcher for the Seattle Mariners of the Major League Baseball (MLB).

Rice grew up in a Air Force family which eventually settled in Colorado Springs where he attended Air Academy High School.

From –, Rice was the pitching coach for the Low-A Wisconsin Timber Rattlers in the Mariners organization. From –, he was the minor league pitching coordinator for the Mariners. On December 15, 2008, he was announced as the pitching coach for Triple-A Fresno.

Rice left the San Francisco Giants organization after 2013 season and was hired on with Los Angeles Angels of Anaheim organization and has been named pitching coach for their Double A Arkansas Travelers. In 2015, he was named the pitching coordinator of the upper level for the Angels.

Rice was hired by the Washington Nationals to be the pitching coach for the Low-A Fredericksburg Nationals during their inaugural season in 2021. Rice was fired at the end of the season.

His two oldest sons played college baseball at Liberty.

References

External links

1963 births
Living people
American expatriate baseball players in Canada
Arkansas Razorbacks baseball players
Baseball coaches from South Dakota
Baseball players from South Dakota
Calgary Cannons players
Major League Baseball pitchers
Salt Lake City Trappers players
San Bernardino Spirit players
Seattle Mariners players
Sportspeople from Rapid City, South Dakota
Vermont Mariners players
Wausau Timbers players
Williamsport Bills players